Sierksdorf station is a railway station in the municipality of Sierksdorf, located in the Ostholstein district in Schleswig-Holstein, Germany.

References

Railway stations in Schleswig-Holstein
Buildings and structures in Ostholstein